Seven Nannies is a 1962 Soviet comedy film, directorial debut of Rolan Bykov.

Plot
At one of the watch factories works the youth team, nicknamed as the "golden" because of how they perform in everything — both in work and in public life. But the guys wish to accomplish some other feat — they decide to re-educate a difficult teenager Afanasy Polosukhin (Semyon Morozov) from a colony for juvenile offenders.

He is taken straight from the prison colony and enthusiastically re-educated, but Afanasy does not even think about changing his ways. When the comfortable new life begins he finds it all too easy to deceive his mentors. However, the secret still becomes apparent. When Afanasy truly decides to change, he finds it to be too late — the desperate young men decide to admit their obvious moral defeat and to return the guy back to the colony to serve a further severe punishment prescribed by the court.

Cast

References

External links

1962 directorial debut films
1962 films
1960s teen comedy films
1962 comedy films
Films directed by Rolan Bykov
Mosfilm films
Soviet teen comedy films
1960s Russian-language films